“Low C” is a song from British rock band Supergrass’s fifth studio album, Road to Rouen (2005). It was released on 24 October 2005 as the second single from the album and peaked at number #52 in the United Kingdom, lasting only one week on the UK Singles Chart.

Music Video
The music video was shot at Weeki Wachee Springs.

Track listings
Limited Edition Seven Inch (R6675)
 “Low C” (4:18)
 “Roxy” (acoustic, live from Ronnie Scotts) (3:45)

CD (CDR6675)
 “Low C” (4:18)
 “Low C” (live from Oxford Playhouse) (4:16)

DVD (DVDR6675)
 “Low C” (4:18)
 “Lady Day and John Coltrane” (acoustic – live from Ronnie Scotts)
 “Low C” (video) (5:16)
 “St. Petersburg” (video) (3:12)

References

Supergrass songs
2005 singles
2005 songs
Parlophone singles